A dogfight is an aerial battle between fighter aircraft.

Dogfight may also refer to:

Film and television
 Dogfight (film), 1991, set in 1960s San Francisco
 Dogfights (TV series), featuring military air combat re-enactments

Games
 Dogfight (1980 computer game), for the Apple II
 SGI Dogfight, a 1985 game for SGI workstations
 Dogfight (1993 computer game), for DOS, Atari and Amiga
 Dogfights: The Game, a 2007 PC game based on the TV series
 Dogfighter (2010 computer game), for Windows

Toys
 Dogfight (G.I. Joe), a fictional character
 Dogfight (Transformers) a fictional character
 Dog Fighter, a series of radio-controlled cars by Yokomo
Yokomo YZ-834B, the first of a series of cars also named "Dog Fighter"

Other uses
 Dogfight (musical), based on the 1991 film
 "Dogfight" (short story), by Michael Swanwick and William Gibson
 "DOGFIGHT", a song by M.o.v.e
 Dog fighting, a blood sport in which dogs are trained to attack each other
 Play fighting among dogs as a natural part of Dog behaviour
 "Dogfight!" an episode in the manga series Initial D
 "Dog Fight", a dubstep track by the artist Virtual Riot